The Karmelitenkirche or Carmelite Church of St. Nicholas is a  Baroque former church at Karmeliterstraße in Munich, Germany. The monastery church was consecrated in 1660. Today it is used as an oratory for the library and reading room of the Metropolitan Chapter of Munich. It is also used for the Archives of the Archdiocese of Munich and Freising.

References 

Former churches in Munich
Baroque architecture in Munich
Carmelite churches in Germany
Cultural heritage monuments in Munich